Geoff Stevens (born 17 August 1942) is a South African sailor. He competed in the Tornado event at the 1992 Summer Olympics.

References

External links
 

1942 births
Living people
South African male sailors (sport)
Olympic sailors of South Africa
Sailors at the 1992 Summer Olympics – Tornado
Place of birth missing (living people)